The Road to Berth is a 1962 Soviet drama film directed by Georgiy Daneliya.

Plot 
The film tells about a guy named Vasya, who decides to go to the Arctic. There he finds a job on the sea rescue tow. Together with the crew he will have to tow the ship Polotsk from Novaya Zemlya, which was defeated as a result of the war.

Cast 
 Boris Andreyev as Zosima Rosomakha
 Oleg Zhakov as Georgiy Gastev
 Lyubov Sokolova as Mariya
 Aleksandr Metyolkin as Vaska Metyolkin  
 Valentin Nikulin as Marat Lepin  
 Bruno O'Ya as Bruno  
 Ada Sheremetyeva as Mayka  
 Igor Bogolyubov as Gennadiy Borisovich
 Viktor Kolpakov as senior mechanic
 Georgiy Vitsin as Velikankin
 Sergei Nikonenko as detonator on duty

References

External links 
 

1962 films
1960s Russian-language films
Soviet drama films
1962 drama films
Mosfilm films
Soviet black-and-white films
Films directed by Georgiy Daneliya
Films about navies
Films based on Russian novels